ADGRV1, also known as G protein-coupled receptor 98 (GPR98) or Very Large G-protein coupled receptor 1 (VLGR1), is a protein that in humans is encoded by the GPR98 gene. Several alternatively spliced transcripts have been described.

The adhesion GPCR VLGR1 is the largest GPCR known, with a size of 6300 amino acids and consisting of 90 exons.   There are 8 splice variants of VlgR1, named VlgR1a-1e and Mass1.1-1.3.  The N-terminus consists of 5800 amino acids containing 35 Calx-beta domains, one pentraxin domain, and one epilepsy associated repeat.  Mutations of VlgR1 have been shown to result in Usher's syndrome.  Knockouts of Vlgr1 in mice have been shown to phenocopy Usher's syndrome and lead to audiogenic seizures.

Function 

This gene encodes a member of the adhesion-GPCR family of receptors. The protein binds calcium and is expressed in the central nervous system. It is also known as very large G-protein coupled receptor 1 because it is 6300 residues long. It contains a C-terminal 7-transmembrane receptor domain, whereas the large N-terminal segment (5900 residues) includes 35 calcium binding Calx-beta domains, and 6 EAR domains.

Evolution
The sea urchin genome has a homolog of VLGR1 in it.

Clinical significance 

Mutations in this gene are associated with Usher syndrome 2 and familial febrile seizures.

References

Further reading

External links
  GeneReviews/NCBI/NIH/UW entry on Usher Syndrome Type II

Receptors
G protein-coupled receptors